Flight 855 may refer to

Air India Flight 855, crashed on 1 January 1978
Eastern Air Lines Flight 855, lost three engines on 5 May 1983

0855